Freadelpha exigua is a species of beetle in the family Cerambycidae. It was described by Kolbe in 1896.

References

Sternotomini
Beetles described in 1896